An organic cation transport protein mediates the transport of organic cations across the cell membrane.  These proteins are members of the solute carrier family, subfamily 22.  This family of proteins can also transport zwitterions and anions, though it is a different subfamily of solute carrier proteins than the organic anion transporters.

Proteins

References

Solute carrier family
Transmembrane transporters
Transport proteins